Laprise or LaPrise is a French Canadian surname which is most prevalent in Canada, but can also be found to a lesser degree in the United States. 

It consists of the French feminine singular article la followed by the past participle of prendre (to take, to seize), prise, and may be translated into English as "the catch" or "the taking". As a toponymic surname it may have been connected to newly cultivated land claimed from the wilderness or could have denoted as an occupational surname a hunter, trapper or soldier.  

Notable people with the name Laprise/LaPrise include:

Chad Laprise (born 1986), Canadian professional mixed martial artist
Gérard Laprise (1925–2000), Social Credit Party and Ralliement créditiste member of the House of Commons of Canada
Larry LaPrise (1912–1996), American songwriter and musician
Normand Laprise (born 1961), French Canadian chef and author

References

French-language surnames
Occupational surnames
Toponymic surnames